Keith Bernard Askins (born December 15, 1967) is a retired American professional basketball player.

Basketball career
After playing at the University of Alabama, the 6'7" Askins signed with the National Basketball Association's Miami Heat in 1990, after not being drafted. A versatile athlete who could guard multiple positions, he spent his entire career with the Heat as a reserve and defensive specialist, retiring after being waived in 1999 with career totals of 1,852 points and 1,428 rebounds.

Immediately after retiring, Askins joined the Heat's coaching staff, going on to serve as assistant for Pat Riley and Erik Spoelstra and winning three championships. In September 2013, he was promoted to the team's director of college and pro scouting. A career all spent with the Heat either as a player, assistant coach, or front office executive, Askins is into his 32nd season with the same franchise as of 2022.

On May 7, 2022, Askins was induced to the Alabama Sports Hall of Fame.

Personal life
A graduate of the University of Alabama with a marketing degree, Askins currently resides in El Paso with his wife and twin boys.

References

External links
 NBA.com coach profile
 Stats at BasketballReference

1967 births
Living people
Alabama Crimson Tide men's basketball players
American men's basketball players
Basketball coaches from Alabama.
Basketball players from Alabama
Miami Heat assistant coaches
Miami Heat players
People from Athens, Alabama
Shooting guards
Small forwards
Undrafted National Basketball Association players